The Kitāb al-Taṣrīf, known in English as The Method of Medicine, is a 30-volume Arabic encyclopedia on medicine and surgery, written near the year 1000 by Abu al-Qasim al-Zahrawi (Abulcasis). It is available in translation.
The  took al-Zahrawi over 50 years to complete. It contains information about a wide variety of illnesses, injuries, medical conditions, treatments, and surgical procedures. It describes over 200 different surgical instruments. Surgeons continued to rely on the  well into the 1700s; some of Al-Zahrawi’s surgical procedures are still being used to this very day. This book was read by medical students at major universities in Europe until the late 1800s.

Summary 
The work covers a broad range of medical topics, including on surgery, medicine, orthopaedics, ophthalmology, pharmacology, nutrition, dentistry, childbirth, and pathology. The last treatise and the most celebrated one is about surgery. Al-Zahrawi stated that he chose to discuss surgery in the last volume because surgery is the highest form of medicine, and one must not practice it until he becomes well-acquainted with all other branches of medicine.

On Surgery and Instruments

In it, al-Zahrawi draws diagrams of each tool used in different procedures to clarify how to carry out the steps of each treatment.

Al-Zahrawi claims that his knowledge comes from careful reading of previous medical texts as well as his own experience: “…whatever skill I have, I have derived for myself by my long reading of the books of the Ancients and my thirst to understand them until I extracted the knowledge of it from them. Then through the whole of my life I have adhered to experience and practice…I have made it accessible for you and rescued it from the abyss of prolixity”.

In the beginning of his book, al-Zahrawi states that the reason for writing this treatise was the degree of underdevelopment surgery had reached in the Islamic world, and the low status it was held by the physicians at the time. Al-Zahrawi ascribed such decline to a lack of anatomical knowledge and a misunderstanding of the human physiology.

Noting the importance of anatomy, he wrote: 

Innovative surgical techniques discussed by al-Zahrawi in the volume include crushing bladder stones with a sort of lithotrite he called "michaab", and using forceps for extracting a dead fetus. The text also contains a number of innovations in dentistry, including using gold and silver wires to ligate loosened teeth, extracting and replanting teeth, and scaling the calculus from the teeth to prevent periodontal disease.

Al-Zahrawi depicted over 200 surgical instruments, some of which he created himself. Instruments in the al-Tasrif include different kinds of scalpels, retractors, curettes, pincers, specula, and also instruments designed for his favoured techniques of cauterization and ligature. He also invented hooks with a double tip for use in surgery.

Latin translation and legacy

The book was translated into Latin in the 12th century by Gerard of Cremona. It soon found popularity in Europe and became a standard text in universities like those of Salerno and Montpellier. It remained the primary source on surgery in Europe for the next 500 years, and as the historian of medicine, Arturo Castiglioni, has put it: al-Zahrawi's treatise "in surgery held the same authority as did the Canon of Avicenna in medicine".

Manuscripts 
 Patna Manuscripts Two manuscripts are known from the archives of Khuda Bakhsh Oriental Public Library in Patna (India). These copies date back to the early 18th century CE.

See also 
 Islamic medicine

References

External links 
 Al-Tasrif - islamset.com
Sami Hamarneh Drawings and Pharmacy in Al-Zahrawi's 10th-Century Surgical Treatise, in United States National Museum Bulletin No.228, 1961

Medical works of the medieval Islamic world
Scientific works of Al-Andalus
10th-century Arabic books
1000 books
Arabic-language encyclopedias
Encyclopedias of medicine